CMRI may refer to:

  Children's Medical Research Institute, an Australian scientific research group
 Computer Model Railroad Interface
 Congregatio Mariae Reginae Immaculatae or Congregation of Mary Immaculate Queen, a sedevacantist Catholic religious congregation